Mary Turns McGregor (11 January 1926 – 27 January 1993) was a New Zealand cricketer who played as a right-handed batter. She appeared in two Test matches for New Zealand between 1954 and 1957. She played domestic cricket for Canterbury.

References

External links
 
 

1926 births
1993 deaths
People from North Canterbury
New Zealand women cricketers
New Zealand women Test cricketers
Canterbury Magicians cricketers
Cricketers from Canterbury, New Zealand